Algis Matulionis (born April 9, 1947) is a Lithuanian film and stage actor, director, former chairman of the Lithuanian Theatre Union. He has appeared in more than 30 films and television shows and has played many theatre roles.

Biography 
In 1967, he became an actor of Kaunas State Drama Theater. In 1972, Matulionis graduated from the faculty of acting of the Lithuanian Conservatory. He has appeared in more than 30 films and TV shows and has played many theatre roles.

After Lithuania gained independence from Soviet Union, Matulionis has continued to work in both film and theatre. In 1994, he founded the Independent Actors Theatre, and has directed television productions. He was the chairman of the Lithuanian Theatre Union from 1996 to 2011.

Family 
 Wife: Nina Radaityte, actress
 Children: son Povilas and daughter Ugne

Selected filmography 
 1971: Stone on Stone as Lauras
 1982: The Longest Straw as Francis
 1985: Dubultslazds as Gunar
 1985: The Match Will Take Place in Any Weather as Irzhi Patochka
1986: Double Trap as Gunar
 1988: The 13th Apostle as priest
 1990: The Hostage as Britanov
 1990: The Executioner as Waldemar, the executioner 
 1991: Genius as Uvarov, police colonel

References

External links
 

1947 births
Soviet male actors
Lithuanian male film actors
Living people
20th-century Lithuanian male actors
21st-century Lithuanian male actors
Soviet film directors
Lithuanian film directors
Soviet screenwriters
Lithuanian screenwriters
Male screenwriters
Lithuanian Academy of Music and Theatre alumni
Male actors from Vilnius
Film people from Vilnius
Lithuanian male writers